Broken is a 2005 film edited by Alex Ferrari and co-written by Ferrari and Jorge F. Rodriguez, starring Samantha Gurewitz, Paul Gordon and Amber Crawford. The film had a limited run in theatres and was released to DVD.

Plot
Bonnie abducted by a sadistic stranger and his colorful entourage, she discovers that the key to her survival lies within the familiar realms of her recurring dream.

Cast

Samantha Gurewitz as Bonnie
Paul Gordon (actor) as Duncan
Amber Crawford	as Marquez
Derek Evans as Christian
Tony Gomez as Gabriel
Jose Luis Navas as Snake
Danilo Begovic as Pinball
Stephan Morris as Shamon

References

External links
 Official website
 

2005 films
2005 short films
American short films
2000s English-language films